Face to Face is a 1922 American silent mystery film directed by Harry Grossman and starring Marguerite Marsh, Edna Holman and Coit Albertson. It was distributed by the independent company Playgoers Pictures.

Synopsis
At the same time as John Weston commits suicide, burglar Bert Manners is panicked and shoots his own reflection in the mirror. Arrested for murder, a schoolgirl friend of the dead man turns detective to prove him innocent of the killing.

Cast
 Marguerite Marsh as Helen Marsley
 Edna Holman as Grace Weston
 F.W. Stewart as John W. Weston
 Coit Albertson as Jack Weston
 Joe Smith Marba as Martin Hartley 
 Frances White as Cleo Rand
 William Kendall as Bert Manners

References

Bibliography
 Connelly, Robert B. The Silents: Silent Feature Films, 1910-36, Volume 40, Issue 2. December Press, 1998.
 Munden, Kenneth White. The American Film Institute Catalog of Motion Pictures Produced in the United States, Part 1. University of California Press, 1997.
Wlaschin, Ken. Silent Mystery and Detective Movies: A Comprehensive Filmography. McFarland, 2009.

External links
 

1922 films
1922 mystery films
American silent feature films
American mystery films
American black-and-white films
1920s English-language films
1920s American films
Silent mystery films